Ilpo Salmivirta (born October 17, 1983) is a Finnish former ice hockey left winger.

Salmivirta played 31 games in the SM-liiga for Tappara between 2004 and 2006 and scored zero points. He also played in the French Ligue Magnus between 2007 and 2017, playing for Dauphins d'Épinal, Dragons de Rouen, Gothiques d'Amiens, Ducs de Dijon, Chamonix HC and Boxers de Bordeaux. He also had a month-loan trial with the Sheffield Steelers of the Elite Ice Hockey League in September 2013, playing five league games and three cup games before returning to France.

Career statistics

References

External links

1983 births
Living people
Boxers de Bordeaux players
Chamonix HC players
Dauphins d'Épinal players
Dragons de Rouen players
Ducs de Dijon players
Finnish ice hockey left wingers
Gothiques d'Amiens players
Kiekko-Vantaa players
KooKoo players
Mikkelin Jukurit players
HC Salamat players
Sheffield Steelers players
Tappara players
Vaasan Sport players
Finnish expatriate ice hockey players in France
Finnish expatriate ice hockey players in England